Rosalind Elizabeth "Rozzi" Crane (born May 2, 1991) is an American singer-songwriter from San Francisco. At 19 years old, Crane made her name known by being discovered by Maroon 5
lead singer Adam Levine. Soon after she was touring the country with Maroon 5. Levine and Crane parted ways in 2016. Crane released her first album Bad Together (2018).

Life and career
Crane attended Marin Academy High School and became a strong member in their musical program.

In 2009, Crane attended the Thornton School of Music at the University of Southern California as a member of the inaugural class of the Popular Music program. During her first year, Crane's original compositions were licensed for the first time when four of her songs were featured in Lifetime Television's second most-watched film ever, Sins of the Mother. During her sophomore and junior years, Crane was a background vocalist for Don Henley and Sergio Mendes.

In 2012, she became the first artist signed to Adam Levine's record label, 222 Records, where she launched three EPs, Rozzi Crane in 2013, Space and Time in 2015, respectively. Crane met bassist and primary collaborator Sam Wilkes in 2009 and he remains the bassist and musical director of Crane's band as of 2014.

Crane was featured on the Maroon 5 song "Come Away to the Water", which was part of The Hunger Games soundtrack and has toured with the band. In 2013, Crane went on tour with the band for their Overexposed Tour. In 2014, Crane toured as an opening for Gavin DeGraw and Parachute, meanwhile in 2015 she opened for Maroon 5 during their Maroon V Tour in United States and Canada. Also in 2015, she became the opener for Owl City's On the Verge Tour for his latest album Mobile Orchestra.

In April 2015, Elvis Duran picked Crane as his Artist of the Month and she performed her single "Psycho" live on NBC's Today show hosted by Kathie Lee Gifford and Hoda Kotb. Crane was also featured on Jimmy Kimmel Live and performed her single "Never Over You" 

Crane is currently signed to Small Giant Records/Columbia Records. On January 12, 2018, she released "Uphill Battle," the first song in a succession of releases that led to the release of her first full-length album, Bad Together, later that year on Small Giant/Columbia Records. Crane's first single "Never Over You" was released on February 9, 2018.  Additionally, Crane released a video of the recording at Capitol Records. In 2019, Crane recorded a cover version of "Creep" by Radiohead, for the first season soundtrack of The Morning Show, where she also appears in the episode "A Seat at the Table" as a lounge singer.

In May 2020, Crane launched a podcast with co-host Scott Hoying called Ugh! You're So Good!, featuring guests such as Jonathan Van Ness, Christina Perri, Adam Rippon, and Rickey Minor. Season 2 of Ugh! Your'e So Good! premiered February 2021. Crane has released 2 singles in 2020. She released "Best Friend Song" late August 2020, bemoaning her loss after her best-friend "Tatti" moved out, and released "Orange Skies", a ballad on the wildfire crisis in her hometown of California, early October.

Her EP Hymn For Tomorrow was released in 2021, with its first single "Hymn for Tomorrow" released February 2021. The music video for "Hymn For Tomorrow" features her partner Alex Wolff.

On April 22, 2022, she released another EP entitled Berry, which features an appearance from Nile Rodgers. A deluxe version, with tracks from Hymn For Tomorrow and new bonus tracks, one of which features PJ Morton, was released in November of 2022.

Filmography

Television

Concert tours
Opening act
 Maroon 5 – Overexposed Tour (2013)
 Maroon 5 and Kelly Clarkson – 2013 Honda Civic Tour (2013) 
 Gavin DeGraw – Make a Move Tour (2014)
 Maroon 5 – Maroon V Tour (2015)
 Owl City – On the Verge Tour (2015)
 Betty Who – Betty: The Tour (2019)

Discography

Albums 
 Bad Together (2018)
 Berry (Deluxe) (2023)

EPs 
 Rozzi Crane (2013)
 Space (2015)
 Time (2015)
 Hymn for Tomorrow (2021)
 Berry (2022)

Singles 
 "Crazy Ass Bitch" (Remix) featuring Kendrick Lamar (2014)
 "Psycho" (Remix) featuring Pusha T (2015)
 "Never Over You" (2018)
 "Uphill Battle" (2018)
 "Joshua Tree" (2018)
 "Lose Us" featuring Scott Hoying (2018)
 "Best Friend Song" (2020)
 "Orange Skies" (2020)
"Hymn For Tomorrow" (2021)
"I Can't Go To The Party" (2021)
"June" (2021)
"Mad Man" (2021)
"fflow" (2022)

Songwriting Credits 

 "Collect My Love (feat. Alex Newell)" by The Knocks (2016)
 "Love Songs" by Daryl Braithwaite (2020) [certified gold in Australia]

Music videos

References

External links
 

Singers from California
1991 births
Living people
USC Thornton School of Music alumni
222 Records artists
21st-century American singers